Conus buxeus, common name the fig cone, is a species of sea snail, a marine gastropod mollusk in the family Conidae, the cone snails and their allies.

Like all species within the genus Conus, these snails are predatory and venomous. They are capable of "stinging" humans, therefore live ones should be handled carefully or not at all.

There is one subspecies : Conus buxeus loroisii Kiener, 1845 (synonyms : Conus agrestis Mörch, 1850; Conus figulinus var. insignis Dautzenberg, 1937; Conus huberorum da Motta, 1989; Dendroconus loroisii insignis (f)  Dautzenberg, 1937)

Description
The size of the shell varies between 30 mm and 135 mm.

Distribution
This species occurs in the Indo-West Pacific.

References

 Kiener, L.-C., 1845–50  Genre Cone. (Conus, Linné). Volume 2. In: Spécies général et iconographie des coquilles vivantes, p. 379 p.
 Tucker J.K. & Tenorio M.J. (2009) Systematic classification of Recent and fossil conoidean gastropods. Hackenheim: Conchbooks. 296 pp. 
 Hawaiian shell news VOL XXXII #.5 MAY 1984 NEW SERIES 293 pp. 9–10
 Puillandre N., Duda T.F., Meyer C., Olivera B.M. & Bouchet P. (2015). One, four or 100 genera? A new classification of the cone snails. Journal of Molluscan Studies. 81: 1–23

External links
 The Conus Biodiversity website
 Cone Shells – Knights of the Sea
 
 Syntype in MNHN, Paris

buxeus
Gastropods described in 1798